William Shelton may refer to:

 William Shelton (chief) (1869–1938), of the Snohomish tribe of Native Americans
 Bill Shelton (footballer, born 1902), Australian rules footballer for Melbourne
 Bill Shelton (politician) (1929–2003), Conservative Party politician in the United Kingdom
 Bill Shelton (footballer, born 1936), Australian rules footballer for Hawthorn
 William L. Shelton (born 1954), United States Air Force general
 William Shelton (university administrator), interim chancellor at East Carolina University